Hurlstone may refer to:
 Hurlstone Park, New South Wales
 Hurlstone Agricultural High School
 Hurlstone Point
Gary Hurlstone (born 1963), English professional footballer
 William Yeates Hurlstone, an English composer